The Obscene Extreme festival, shortened as OEF, is an annual music festival in the Czech Republic, that focuses on extreme metal subgenres grindcore and death metal, as well as hardcore punk. It was founded in 1999 as a birthday party by Miloslav "Čurby" Urbanec. It was described by Vice as "Europe's craziest grindcore party". It is noted by the Czech Radio for its "exceptionally tolerant and friendly atmosphere". The festival offers exclusively vegetarian and vegan food within its premises since its inception.

Several well-known metal bands have performed at OEF over the years, such as: Napalm Death, Possessed, Obituary, Sodom, Immolation, Grave, Suffocation, Vader, Incantation, Terrorizer, Exhumed, Asphyx, Morgoth, Brujeria, Sinister, Nuclear Assault, Hirax, Vital Remains, Eyehategod, Krisiun, and Municipal Waste to name a few.

References

External links
 
 Official website

1999 establishments in the Czech Republic
Heavy metal festivals in the Czech Republic
Recurring events established in 1999
Summer events in the Czech Republic
Vegetarian festivals
Vegetarian organizations